Football Cup of the Soviet Union among teams of physical culture collectives was an association football competitions among amateur clubs and physical culture collectives that were conducted in the Soviet Union in 1957–1991 under auspices of the Football Federation of the Soviet Union. Throughout its history the tournament was also known as the VTsSPS Cup, Soviet Cup among production collectives, and Cup of the millions.

In 1957 in the Soviet football took place another reform, after which physical culture collectives (amateur teams) were restricted from competing in the Soviet Cup and for them was organized a separate tournament. In 1962–1967 the winner was identified in the final group stage. In 1981–1988 the competition was not conducted.

List of finals

 The "Season" column refers to the season the competition was held, and wikilinks to the article about that season.
 The wikilinks in the "Score" column point to the article about that season's final game.

Notes

External links
 Football Cup of the Soviet Union among teams of physical culture collectives. footballfacts

Cup, amateur
Soviet Union
Recurring sporting events established in 1957
Recurring events disestablished in 1991
1957 establishments in the Soviet Union
1991 disestablishments in the Soviet Union